HMS Argus was launched in 1798 at Bordeaux as Argus. She became a privateer that the British Royal Navy (RN) captured in 1799. She served from April 1803 until she was broken up in April 1811.

Privateer and capture
Argus was a 300-ton (French; "of load") brig or corvette commissioned in Bordeaux in 1798, probably built that same year for Paul Mairac & Sons.

On 10 December 1798, the French privateer Argus brought too Mary, Darby, master, from London to St Vincent's. However the wind was blowing too hard and Argus was unable to board Mary.

On 3 April 1799, HMS Pomone met and captured Argus after a pursuit of 108 miles that hit 12 knots. Argus was only six months old and was pierced for 22 guns, though she carried 18 brass 9-pounders. Prior to her own capture, Argus had captured Minerva and two brigs from Teignmouth whose masters and crews were aboard her. Argus had a crew of 90 men.

Pomone also recaptured, on 9 April, an American schooner that the French privateer  had taken on 1 April. The schooner had been on her way from Caracas to Corunna with a cargo of cocoa and indigo.

Royal Navy
Argus arrived at Plymouth on 4 May 1799 and was laid up. After the resumption of war with France, she underwent fitting between March and July 1803.

Commander Edward King commissioned Argus in June 1803 for the Irish station. She spent her career primarily convoying vessels between Ireland and English ports such as Plymouth and Portsmouth.

On 15 April 1804, she convoyed a number of vessels from Cork to Falmouth. Argus detained Sally, Swazy, master, which had been sailing from Boston to Amsterdam, and sent her into Plymouth.

Commander Edward Kittoe replaced King in May 1804. In October Argus detained and sent into Plymouth Nuestra Senora del Carmen. She had been sailing from Cadiz and she arrived in Plymouth on 29 October.

On 16 February 1805, Argus came across Susan, of Appledore, Pitts, master, about 12 leagues south of Cork. There was no one aboard so Argus towed Susan towards Cork. Near the Harbour Rock  Susan sank.

Kittoe left in 1806, and Commander James Stuart assumed command in October.

HMS Niobe, Captain J. W. Loring, and Argus, Commander James Stuart, captured the Danish ship King of Assianthe (Ashanti) on 31 August 1807.

On 20 September, Argus detained Fortuna and on 23 September recaptured Providence.  Fortuna, of and from Dram, had been sailing for Clonalky. Argus also detained at Cork Kimro (of Arundahl), Uberant, master, which had been sailing from Youghal to Lisbon. A Spanish privateer of 11 guns and 120 men had captured Providence as Providence was sailing from Galway.

In early 1810, Argus ran down and sank Union, Papler, master at Waterford; the crew was rescued. Union had been sailing from Poole to Waterford.

In April 1810, Commander Joseph Bott replaced Stuart.

Fate
The Navy Board visited the dockyards and prepared a list of vessels that it condemned to be broken up and sold The "Principal Officers and Commissioners of His Majesty's Navy" offered the sloop Argus for sale on 18 October 1810. She apparently did not sell, and instead was broken up at Plymouth in April 1811.

Notes, citations, and references
Notes

Citations

References
 
 
 
 

1798 ships
Ships built in France
Privateer ships of France
Captured ships
Sloops of the Royal Navy